Damian Brown (born 20 March 1970 in Adelaide) is an Australian weightlifter who competed at three Olympic Games and four Commonwealth Games.

He competed at the 1992 Barcelona, 1996 Atlanta and 2000 Sydney Olympics in the middleweight class. His best result was fourteenth in 2000.

At the Commonwealth Games, Brown won four gold medals, a silver medal and three bronze medals between 1990 and 2002.  He was Australia's flag bearer during the opening ceremony for the 2002 Commonwealth Games in Manchester.

He was an ambassador for Australia Day in the local area.

References

External links
 Profile at Australian Olympic Committee

1970 births
Living people
Sportspeople from Adelaide
Australian male weightlifters
Olympic weightlifters of Australia
Weightlifters at the 1992 Summer Olympics
Weightlifters at the 1996 Summer Olympics
Weightlifters at the 2000 Summer Olympics
Weightlifters at the 1990 Commonwealth Games
Weightlifters at the 1994 Commonwealth Games
Weightlifters at the 1998 Commonwealth Games
Weightlifters at the 2002 Commonwealth Games
Commonwealth Games gold medallists for Australia
Commonwealth Games silver medallists for Australia
Commonwealth Games bronze medallists for Australia
Commonwealth Games medallists in weightlifting
20th-century Australian people
21st-century Australian people
Medallists at the 1990 Commonwealth Games
Medallists at the 1994 Commonwealth Games
Medallists at the 1998 Commonwealth Games
Medallists at the 2002 Commonwealth Games